Hypotia opiparalis is a species of snout moth in the genus Hypotia. It was described by Charles Swinhoe in 1890 and is known from India.

References

Moths described in 1890
Hypotiini